Nokuthula Ndlovu (born 15 May 1983) is a Zimbabwean former footballer who played as a midfielder. She has been a member of the Zimbabwe women's national team.

Club career
Ndlovu has played for New Orleans in Zimbabwe.

International career
Ndlovu capped for Zimbabwe at senior level during the 2014 African Women's Championship qualification.

References

1983 births
Living people
Zimbabwean women's footballers
Women's association football midfielders
Zimbabwe women's international footballers